Harris City Academy Crystal Palace is a mixed-sex secondary school in Croydon, south London, England. It was established in 1990 to replace Sylvan High School, a newly built mixed comprehensive school which had opened in 1974. Sylvan, judged to be under-performing, re-opened as a City Technology College (CTC) sponsored by Lord Harris of Peckham. In September 2007, Harris CTC became Harris City Academy Crystal Palace.

Background
The new Harris CTC introduced new systems and structures and results steadily improved. In recent years the examination performance of the school has been excellent.

The conversion to Academy status in September 2007 brought with it the promise of £10 Million for new buildings and facilities. The work on the new buildings was completed by November 2010, with a new sixth form block, reception, internal walkways and classrooms now in use.

The Sixth Form results were also the best ever achieved by the Academy with 100% of students passing their A-level exams and 82% of all grades achieved resulting in a grade A, B or C.

In October 2009, under the new tougher Ofsted inspection criteria, the Academy became the first secondary school in the country to achieve an outstanding grade in each of the 30 categories. By Easter 2010, the Academy was still the only school in England to have achieved this result.

Over 2000 applications were received for 180 places in Year 7 for September 2009. The intake of the Academy is of mixed ability.

The Sixth Form is part of a federated Sixth Form with Harris South Norwood, Harris Merton, Harris Purley, Harris Bromley, Harris Beckenham and Harris East Dulwich Girls. The Sixth Form at Crystal Palace delivers primarily AS and A level courses and around 400 students are based there. The other two sites offer some AS and A levels but also a range of vocational courses.  Harris City Academy Crystal Palace is also a registered Cisco Networking Academy and offers the CCNA course to Post-16s throughout the Federation as part of the enrichment programme.

The Academy is a Gifted and Talented specialist school. Specific new opportunities for students include an annual opportunity for three Post-16 students to visit NASA astronaut training facilities in HACCP and Florida in the USA and many residential trips.

The new Year 7's get to go on an optional trip to PGL in October every year just for the year 7's.

The Student Commission
The Harris Federation Student Commission is a project which involves 70 students from all the Harris Academies are working together with teachers and leading educationalists in order to explore ways of further improving teaching and learning. This Commission is supported by NESTA and is part of a national project called Learning Futures.

Year Structure

Each year group of the Academy, students are divided into four faculties 
 Arts 
 Communications 
 Maths & Commerce
 Science and PE.
In each year group, there are now six tutor groups (there are sometimes 1 for some faculties) consisting of approximately 20-30 students.

In each Year, the students are split into two groups x and y.

There are sets for both groups. Sets: X1/Y1, X2/Y2, X3/Y3, and X4/Y4. The bands X and Y are not based on ability however the set you are in is based on your ability for example X1/Y1 are the top sets and X2/Y2 are the second top sets.

The reason for having X and Y bands is due to the fact that not everyone is doing the same subject at once for example X might be doing Science and Y might be doing French.

From September 2009 – all students started GCSEs in maths, science and English a year early, and from September 2009 all GCSEs are started in Year 9.

Students get to choose their GCSE options in Year 8 and start doing the subjects they chose in Year 9: as with most English schools Maths, English and the three sciences are compulsory choices for students' GCSEs.

Faculties
There are four faculties at Harris City Academy Crystal Palace, identified by a colour typically displayed on the stripe of their students' ties. They are:
Arts (green)
Communications (blue)
Maths & Commerce (red)
Science & PE (yellow)

The academy also has post-16 provision, which contains Year 12 and Year 13 students. The sixth form teaches a variety of subjects, and is also part of a Rugby training school in conjunction with Harlequins.

Harris Federation

The school was founded in 1990 as a City Technology College. In September 2007, Harris CTC was integrated into the Harris Federation. This Federation was set up by Lord Harris of Peckham and has been set up as a coalition of several secondary schools in Croydon, Merton and Southwark. In September 2013, the Harris Federation of South London Schools consisted of twenty-one schools.

External links
Harris City Academy Crystal Palace webpage
Harris Federation website
Harris Federation Sixth Form website
Harris City Academy Crystal Palace Twitter
Harris City Academy Crystal Palace YouTube
Harris City Academy Crystal Palace Flickr

References

Academies in the London Borough of Croydon
Harris City Technology College
Secondary schools in the London Borough of Croydon
Crystal Palace
Educational institutions established in 1990
1990 establishments in England